Cartoon Network Hindi (often abbreviated as CN हिंदी में) is a Middle Eastern and North African Hindi-language children's television channel targeted towards 4 to 14 year old South Asian expatriate children in the Arab countries, operated by Warner Bros. Discovery EMEA. As the name implies, the channel broadcasts exclusively in Hindi, which is akin to the Turner's Arabic language children's television channel, Cartoon Network Arabic.

It is the first Hindi-language children's television channel in the Middle East and North Africa. TBS launched Cartoon Network Hindi on April 1, 2016 exclusively on beIN Network satellite television platform. It primarily broadcasts animated programming from both the original American network and the Indian feed.

On January 12, 2017, the channel converted to full HD (1080i), in addition to rebranding to the Dimensional branding package.

References

Cartoon Network
Children's television networks
Turner Broadcasting System Arabic
Turner Broadcasting System Europe
Television channels and stations established in 2016
Hindi-language television stations